The Cercle Royal du Parc is a Belgian gentlemen's club, located in Ixelles, with most members originating from nobility.

History
The Cercle Royal du Parc was founded in 1842 when a group of Belgicist noblemen left the Orangist Cercle de l'Union.
http://www.cercleduparc.be

Notable members
 Baron (Marc-Antoine) de Schoutheete de Tervarent (Président)
 Baron (Jean-Pierre) de Chestret de Haneffe (Secrétaire Général)
 Baron Gaétan van der Bruggen (Trésorier)

Members
 List of members

See also
 Cercle de Lorraine
 Cercle Gaulois
 De Warande

Sources
 Jan Puype, De elite van België - Welkom in de club, Van Halewyck 
 CERCLE ROYAL DU PARC

Ixelles
Gentlemen's clubs in Belgium
1842 establishments in Belgium